The Careless Lovers is a 1673 comedy play by the English writer Edward Ravenscroft. Staged at the Dorset Garden Theatre by the Duke's Company the original cast included Henry Norris as Mr Machworth, Philip Cademan as Mr Lovell, William Smith as Mr Careless, Edward Angel as De Boastado, Margaret Osborne as Mrs Clappam and Elinor Leigh as Beatrice.

References

Bibliography
 Van Lennep, W. The London Stage, 1660-1800: Volume One, 1660-1700. Southern Illinois University Press, 1960.

1673 plays
West End plays
Restoration comedy
Plays by Edward Ravenscroft